Aerobatic maneuvers are flight paths putting aircraft in unusual attitudes, in air shows, dogfights or competition aerobatics. Aerobatics can be performed by a single aircraft or in formation with several others.  Nearly all aircraft are capable of performing aerobatics maneuvers of some kind, although it may not be legal or safe to do so in certain aircraft.

Aerobatics consist of five basic maneuvers:

 Lines (both horizontal and vertical),
 loops,
 rolls,
 spins, and
 hammerheads.

Most aerobatic figures are composites of these basic maneuvers with rolls superimposed.

A loop is when the pilot pulls the plane up into the vertical, continues around until they are heading back in the same direction, like making a 360 degree turn, except it is in the vertical plane instead of the horizontal. The pilot will be inverted (upside down) at the top of the loop. A loop can also be performed by rolling inverted and making the same maneuver but diving towards the ground. It can be visualized as making a loop of ribbon, hence the name it is given (there is an animation depicting a loop on the bottom of this page).

A roll is simply rotating the plane about its roll axis, using the ailerons. It can be done in increments of 360 degrees (i.e. four short 90 degree rolls will bring the aircraft back to its upright position).

A spin is more complex, involving intentionally stalling a single wing, causing the plane to descend spiraling around its yaw axis in a corkscrew motion.

A hammerhead (also known as a stall turn) is performed by pulling the aircraft up until it is pointing straight up (much like the beginning of a loop), but the pilot continues to fly straight up until their airspeed has dropped to a certain critical point. The pilot then uses the rudder to rotate the aircraft around its yaw axis until it has turned 180deg and is pointing straight down, facing the direction from which the aircraft came. The aircraft gains speed, and the pilot continues and returns to level flight, travelling in the opposite direction from which the maneuver began. It is also known as a "tailslide", from the yawing turn, which is different from the typical method of turning an aircraft in the pitch axis.

Table of the basic aerobatic figures
Most of these can be entered either erect or inverted, flown backwards or have extra rolls added.

Where appropriate, the Aresti Catalog symbols have been included. Not all the figures are competition figures, and so some do not have diagrams to accompany the description.

Reading the diagrams, a figure begins at the small solid circle and ends at the short vertical line. Inverted flight (negative g) is depicted by dashed red lines. The small arrow indicates a rolling maneuver.

 Dive; extreme nose down attitude (not necessarily vertical), resulting in an increase in both airspeed and descent rate.
 Lazy eight; 1/4 looping up, wingover (left or right), 1/2 looping down+up, wingover (right or left), 1/4 looping down
 Lomcovak; family of autorotational, tumbling figures.  In all varieties, the aircraft appears to tumble out of control.  For example, one style involves the aircraft tumbling (simultaneously) nose over tail and wingtip over wingtip in a negative-g, gyroscopic condition. Introduced by Czechoslovaks such as Ladislav Bezák, and others.
 Pugachev's Cobra; the nose of the aircraft is pulled up suddenly. The aircraft pitches up to 90–120° angle of attack. The nose then falls back to the horizontal, and the aircraft accelerates away in the original direction 
 Kulbit; post-stall maneuver similar to Pugachev's Cobra, but going to 360° pitch angle, flying a "loop"
 Roll; Rotational motion around the longitudinal axis (the nose rotates around its center).
 Barrel roll; a combination of a loop and a roll. The flight path during a barrel roll has the shape of a horizontal corkscrew and follows a helical path.
 Aileron roll; 360° revolution about the longitudinal axis at maximum roll rate. It consists of a pitch-up followed by a roll which is uncontrolled in the pitch axis, resulting in an initial climb, and then descent to the original altitude.
 Slow roll; roll around the longitudinal axis slowly, maintaining level flight by cross-controlling the elevator and rudder inputs.
 Hesitation roll; slow roll, stopping momentarily at various points during the roll. Common variations include a two-point roll, three-point roll, four-point roll, etc...
 The Scissors; flying in a zigzagging pattern, either horizontal or rolling.
 Standing eight; inside loop, 1/2 roll (inverts the aircraft), inside loop (towards the ground) 1/2 roll on top of the loop
 Wingover; left or right 180° tight turn (yaw) at the top of a 1/4 looping (up)
 Zoom climb; dive followed by extreme nose up attitude (not necessarily vertical). Consists of an initial airspeed gain resulting in an increased rate of climb, followed by airspeed loss and decreased rate of climb, returning to the original speed and altitude.
 Falling leaf; throttle off, wings-level stall, allowing the plane to side-slip in one direction, then countering the slip with rudder before a spin develops, allowing it to side-slip to the other direction, countering with rudder again, diving to exit the maneuver.
 Torque roll; tailslide performed with aileron added in the direction of the engine torque. The aircraft climbs in the vertical until forward momentum is lost, and rolls due to the torque of the engine as it tailslides.

See also
 Basic fighter maneuvers
 Competition aerobatics
 Flight dynamics
 Whifferdill turn

References

External links

 US Air Force e-publishing docs related to Aircraft demonstrations (guidelines include descriptions and illustrations of figures used by USAF pilots on A-10, F-15, F-16, F-22 planes)

Aerobatic maneuvers